Kreiss is a surname. Notable people with this surname include:
Lisa Bonder-Kreiss (born 1965), American tennis player
Fanni Kreiss (born 1989), Hungarian fencer
George Kreiss (1830–1907), American politician
Gunilla Kreiss (born 1958), Swedish mathematician, daughter of Heinz-Otto
Heinz-Otto Kreiss (1930–2015), German-Swedish mathematician, father of Gunilla
Loren B. Kreiss (born 1981), American Interior designer and entrepreneur
Murray Kreiss, founder of the Kreiss furniture company
Robert Kreiss (born 1953), American tennis player
Jonathan Kreiss-Tomkins (born 1989), American politician
Yitshak Kreiss (born 1965), Israeli physician and medical administrator